Hervé Regout (born 4 November 1952) is a Belgian racing driver.

He competed in the 24 Hours of Le Mans nine times between 1980 and 1994 and also competed in the 1979 British Formula One Championship.

Le Mans 24 hours results

References

1952 births
Living people
Belgian racing drivers
Belgian Formula One drivers
British Formula One Championship drivers
European Formula Two Championship drivers
FIA European Formula 3 Championship drivers
IMSA GT Championship drivers
24 Hours of Le Mans drivers
Belgian motorcycle racers
World Sportscar Championship drivers
24 Hours of Spa drivers